Penalty de las Cuatro Torres was a prison located in San Fernando in the Province of Cádiz, Andalusia, Spain.

Buildings and structures in San Fernando, Cádiz
Prisons in Spain